Alan Gordon Partridge is a comedy character portrayed by the English actor Steve Coogan. A parody of British television personalities, Partridge is a tactless and inept broadcaster with an inflated sense of celebrity. Since his debut in 1991, he has appeared in media including radio and television series, books, podcasts and a feature film. 

Partridge was created by Coogan and Armando Iannucci for the 1991 BBC Radio 4 comedy programme On the Hour, a spoof of British current affairs broadcasting, as the show's sports presenter. In 1992, Partridge hosted a spin-off Radio 4 spoof chat show, Knowing Me, Knowing You with Alan Partridge. On the Hour transferred to television as The Day Today in 1994, followed by Knowing Me, Knowing You later that year. In 1997, Coogan starred as Partridge in a BBC sitcom, I'm Alan Partridge, written by Coogan, Iannucci and Peter Baynham, following Partridge's life in a roadside hotel working for a small radio station. It earned two BAFTAs and was followed by a second series in 2002.

After a hiatus, Partridge returned in 2010 with a series of shorts, Mid Morning Matters with Alan Partridge, written with Rob and Neil Gibbons, who have cowritten every Partridge project since. Over the following years, Partridge expanded into other media, including the spoof memoir I, Partridge: We Need to Talk About Alan (2011) and the feature film Alan Partridge: Alpha Papa (2013). In 2019, Partridge returned to the BBC with This Time with Alan Partridge, a spoof of magazine shows such as The One Show, followed by an Audible podcast in 2020 and a touring show in 2022.

While the writers use Partridge to satirise bigotry and privilege, they also wanted to create empathy. Critics have praised Partridge's complexity, realism and pathos. Vanity Fair called him a British national treasure and the Guardian described him as "one of the greatest and most beloved comic creations of the last few decades". Partridge is credited with influencing cringe comedies such as The Inbetweeners, Nighty Night and Peep Show. In a 2001 poll by Channel 4, Partridge was voted seventh in their list of the 100 Greatest TV Characters.

History

1991–1995: On The Hour and Knowing Me, Knowing You 
Alan Partridge was created for the 1991 BBC Radio 4 comedy programme On the Hour, a spoof of British current affairs broadcasting, as the show's hapless sports presenter. He is portrayed by Steve Coogan, who had performed a similar character for a BBC college radio station at university. The producer Armando Iannucci asked Coogan to do a voice for a generic sports reporter, with elements of Elton Welsby, Jim Rosenthal and John Motson. According to Iannucci, "Someone said, 'He's an Alan!' and someone else said, 'He's a Partridge!' Within minutes we knew where he lived, we'd worked out his back story, what his aspirations were." His name was also inspired by the former Newsbeat presenter Frank Partridge. Iannucci, Patrick Marber, Richard Herring and Stewart Lee wrote much of the early Partridge material; Herring credits the creation to Coogan and Iannucci.

Marber felt the character had potential for other projects, and encouraged Coogan to develop it. Coogan performed as Partridge and other characters at the 1992 Edinburgh Festival. In December 1992, BBC Radio 4 began broadcasting a six-episode spoof chat show, Knowing Me, Knowing You with Alan Partridge. The series saw Partridge irritate and offend his guests, and coined his catchphrase, "Aha!".

In 1994, On the Hour transferred to television as The Day Today, in which Partridge reprised his role as sports reporter. Later that year, Knowing Me, Knowing You transferred to television. The series ends with Partridge accidentally shooting a guest. It was nominated for the 1995 BAFTA for Light Entertainment Performance. A Christmas special, Knowing Me, Knowing Yule, followed in December 1995, in which Partridge attacks a BBC commissioning editor, ending his television career.

1997–2010: I'm Alan Partridge and further appearances 
In 1997, Coogan starred in a sitcom, I'm Alan Partridge, written by Coogan, Iannucci and Peter Baynham. The series follows Partridge after he has been left by his wife and dropped from the BBC; he lives in a roadside hotel, presents a graveyard slot on local Norwich radio, and desperately pitches ideas for new television shows. Iannucci said the writers used the sitcom as "a kind of social X-ray of male middle-aged Middle England". It won the 1998 BAFTA awards for Comedy Performance and Comedy Programme or Series.

In 1999, Partridge appeared on the BBC telethon Comic Relief, performing a medley of Kate Bush songs. The BBC broadcast a second series of I'm Alan Partridge in 2002, following Partridge's life in a static caravan with his new Ukrainian girlfriend after recovering from a mental breakdown. The writers found the second series difficult to make, feeling it had been too long since the first and that expectations for sitcoms had changed.

After I'm Alan Partridge, Coogan tired of Partridge and limited him to smaller roles, feeling he had become an "albatross". In March 2003, the BBC broadcast a mockumentary, Anglian Lives: Alan Partridge, about Partridge's life and career. Coogan performed as Partridge at the Royal Albert Hall in support of the Teenage Cancer Trust in 2004, and in 2008 he performed a tour, "Steve Coogan as Alan Partridge and other Less Successful Characters", featuring Partridge as a life coach.

2010–2013: Comeback, memoir and feature film 

Coogan returned to Partridge after pursuing other projects, such as his work with the director Michael Winterbottom on films such as 24 Hour Party People (2002). He said he did not want to say goodbye to Partridge, and that "as long as I can do my other things, that, to me, is the perfect balance". In 2020, he said that though he had once tired of Partridge, he had now become "a battered, comfortable old leather jacket".

Partridge returned in 2010 in a series of YouTube shorts, Mid Morning Matters with Alan Partridge, as the host of a digital radio show with a new character, Sidekick Simon (Tim Key). The series was later broadcast by Sky Atlantic. Coogan wrote it with the brothers Neil and Rob Gibbons, who submitted scripts to his company Baby Cow Productions. The brothers have co-written every Partridge project since. According to Neil, Coogan "invited us in, our sensibilities chimed ... I think we were like two pairs of fresh eyes, and Steve seemed to fall in love with the character all over again." Coogan said they chose the web format because "it was a bit underground, a low-key environment in which to test the character out again. And the response was so good, we realised there was more fuel in the tank." In his 2015 autobiography, Coogan wrote that he felt Mid Morning Matters was "the purest, most mature and funniest incarnation of Partridge", which he credited to the Gibbons brothers.

In 2011, a spoof autobiography, I, Partridge: We Need to Talk About Alan, written by Coogan, Iannucci and the Gibbons brothers, was published. An audiobook version recorded by Coogan as Partridge was released on CD and downloadable formats. In the book, Partridge recounts his childhood and career, attempts to settle scores with people he feels have wronged him, and dispenses wisdom such as his assertion that Wikipedia has made university education "all but pointless". Coogan appeared as Partridge to promote I, Partridge on The Jonathan Ross Show and BBC Radio 5 Live. It received positive reviews and became a bestseller.

On 25 June 2012, Partridge presented a one-hour Sky Atlantic special, Alan Partridge: Welcome to the Places of My Life, taking the viewer on a tour of Partridge's home county Norfolk. The programme earned Coogan the 2013 BAFTA for Best Male Performance in a Comedy Programme. It was followed the next week by Open Books with Martin Bryce, a mock literary programme discussing Partridge's autobiography.

On 7 August 2013, a feature film, Alan Partridge: Alpha Papa, was released in the UK. It was directed by Declan Lowney and co-produced by StudioCanal and Baby Cow Productions, with support from BBC Films and the BFI Film Fund. The film sees Partridge enlisted as a crisis negotiator during a siege at his radio station. Filming began with an incomplete script, and Coogan and the Gibbons brothers rewrote much of it on the set. The rushed production was difficult; Coogan and Iannucci disagreed on the script, morale was low, and there were problems with casting and funding. In his memoir, Coogan wrote that it was the hardest he had ever worked and the loneliest he had ever felt; however, he was proud of the finished film. Alpha Papa was critically acclaimed and opened at number one at the box office in the UK and Ireland.

2015–present: Scissored Isle, This Time and podcast 
In 2015, Coogan co-presented a special Christmas episode of the Channel 4 chat show TFI Friday as Partridge. In February 2016, Sky Atlantic broadcast a second series of Mid Morning Matters. Alan Partridge's Scissored Isle, a mockumentary in which Partridge examines the British class divide, followed in May. A second book, Alan Partridge: Nomad, a travelogue in which Partridge recounts a journey across the UK, was published on 20 October.

In July 2017, Partridge appeared in an episode of the BBC Radio 4 programme Inheritance Tracks, in which guests choose music to pass to future generations; he selected "Who Put the Bomp (in the Bomp, Bomp, Bomp)" by Barry Mann and the theme from Grandstand. Iannucci guest-edited an October 2017 issue of The Big Issue, featuring a debate on Brexit between Partridge and Malcolm Tucker, a character from The Thick of It, another sitcom created by Iannucci. On 27 December, BBC Two broadcast a documentary about the history of Partridge, Alan Partridge: Why, When, Where, How and Whom?.

Partridge returned to the BBC in February 2019 with a six-part series, This Time with Alan Partridge, a spoof current affairs programme in the style of The One Show. In the series, Partridge stands in after the regular host falls ill. Coogan felt it was the right time for Partridge to return, and that he might represent the views of Brexit voters. Neil Gibbons said the world of live television had changed since Partridge's creation: "If someone fluffed a line or got someone's name wrong or said something stupid, it was mortifying. But nowadays, those are the sort of people who are given jobs on TV." A second series was broadcast in 2021.

In September 2020, Partridge launched an Audible podcast, From the Oasthouse. It was carefully scripted rather than improvised; Coogan said the format was liberating, as there was more opportunity for nuance and less need to create punchlines to unite the audience. A second series was released in September 2022. 

In April 2022, Coogan began a UK Alan Partridge tour, Stratagem, in which Partridge gave a motivational talk and addressed topics such as identity politics and culture wars. The Guardian critic Brian Logan gave the show four out of five, praising its "rich comedy of physical awkwardness" and writing that Partridge was now "at the centre of his own thriving multi-platform metaverse". He noted that though Coogan had once tired of Partridge, he now "clearly takes pleasure in the performance". However, the Independent critic Louis Chilton gave it two out of five, finding its jokes were obvious and dated and that Partridge did not work in a live format.

Character 

Alan Partridge is an incompetent and tactless television and radio presenter. He is socially inept, often offending his guests, and has an inflated sense of importance and celebrity. According to the Telegraph, Partridge is "utterly convinced of his own superiority, and bewildered by the world's inability to recognise it". Marber described him as part of a British tradition of "sad little man" characters such as Captain Mainwaring, Basil Fawlty and David Brent. His need for public attention drives him to deceit, treachery and shameless self-promotion, and sometimes violence; for example, in the Knowing Me, Knowing Yule Christmas special, he assaults a BBC boss and a paralysed man. Marber said Partridge's fundamental characteristic is desperation.

Partridge holds right-wing views; he is a reader of the right-wing newspaper the Daily Mail, and supported Brexit because the Mail "told him to". Coogan, who is left-wing, described Partridge as a Little Englander, with a "myopic, slightly philistine mentality". Earlier versions of Partridge were more bigoted, but the writers found there was more humour in having him attempt to be progressive; for example, in I, Partridge, he stresses his friendship with the gay television presenter Dale Winton. Coogan said: "He's aware of political correctness but he's playing catch-up. In the same way that the Daily Mail is a bit PC – it wouldn't be openly homophobic now – Alan is the same. He tries to be modern." Coogan felt the humour came from Partridge's misjudgement, rather than in a celebration of bigotry: "I don't want to add to the sum total of human misery. I want to point out things where we can improve our behaviour, myself included ... I think if you've got a skill and you can make people laugh, use it to hold people who are privileged and powerful accountable."

Partridge lives in Norwich in the East of England. Iannucci said the writers chose it as it is "geographically just that little bit annoyingly too far from London, and has this weird kind of isolated feel that seemed right for Alan". According to Forbes, Partridge has "parochial bad taste", and Coogan described him as "on the wrong side of cool". He is a fan of James Bond films and Lexus cars and his music taste includes Wings and Abba; Partridge named his son Fernando and his talk show Knowing Me, Knowing You after Abba songs, and his talk show catchphrase, "Aha!", also comes from Abba. 

In earlier incarnations, Partridge's wardrobe included a blazer, badge and tie, driving gloves, and "too-short" shorts, styles he describes as "sports casual" and "imperial leisure". According to Iannucci, by the time of Alpha Papa his wardrobe had "evolved to the Top Gear Presenter Circa 2005 stage", with sports jackets and a foppish fringe. As Coogan aged, the ageing makeup he wore in earlier performances became unnecessary. Coogan said that the rise of postmodernism had made it difficult to find clothes for Partridge, as "everything we had once seen as square or distasteful was now being worn by hipsters … The waters of what was uncool became so muddied that it was difficult to find anything looked bad and not just ironic. It even made me question if Alan was still relevant."

According to Coogan, Partridge was originally a "one-note, sketchy character" and "freak show", but slowly became refined as a dysfunctional alter ego. He credited the Gibbons brothers for giving Partridge a "more rounded personality", and said: "The twenty-first-century Alan is a nicer man. He is more empathetic and less about mocking the fool. More Malvolio and less Frank Spencer." The Gibbons brothers felt that by the time of Mid Morning Matters, when Partridge is working for an even smaller radio station, he is more at peace with himself and that his lack of self-awareness saves him from misery. Iannucci said that Partridge stays optimistic because he never sees himself as others see him, and that despite his failings he was "the perfect broadcaster for these times, when there are 24 hours to fill and dead time is a crime – he has a unique capacity to fill any vacuum with his own verbal vacuum".

Baynham told the Guardian that although Partridge was unpleasant, the writers tried to build empathy: "You're watching a man suffer but also at some level identifying with his pain." For Alpha Papa, Coogan wanted Partridge to be "heroic" and for the audience to sympathise with him while laughing at him: "You know he's done the wrong thing, but at least he's got some humanity. It's impossible to sustain ninety minutes of good drama without investing in the character." Felicity Montagu, who plays Partridge's assistant Lynn, felt he was vulnerable and loveable, and a good person "deep down".

Legacy
Vanity Fair described Alan Partridge as "a national treasure ... as cherished a part of British comedy heritage as John Cleese's Basil Fawlty and Rowan Atkinson's Mr. Bean". According to Variety, in Britain "Alan Partridge is a full-on phenomenon, a multiplatform fictional celebrity whose catchphrases, mangled metaphors and social ineptitude are the stuff of legend and good ratings". In 2022, the Guardian journalist Michael Hogan selected Partridge as Coogan's greatest TV role, writing that Coogan had "painstakingly fleshed him out from a catchphrase-spouting caricature to a layered creation of subtle pathos ...  one of our most enduring and beloved comic characters." Partridge is less well known outside the UK; however, according to Adam McKay, the director of the comedy film Anchorman, "Every American comic knows who Steve is, whether it's Stiller or Ferrell or Jack Black or me ... And everyone watching those [Partridge] DVDs had the same reaction. How did I not know about this guy?" IndieWire wrote that "before there was [Anchorman character] Ron Burgundy for the Yanks, there was Alan Partridge for the Brits".

Brian Logan wrote in the Guardian that though Alan Partridge was created as a satire of the "asinine fluency of broadcaster-speak" of the time, his development as a character study gave him a timeless quality. The Guardian journalist John Crace wrote: "By rights, Alan Partridge should have been dead as a character years ago, the last drops of humour long since wrung out ... but Steve Coogan keeps finding ways to make him feel fresh." The Independent wrote that Partridge was a "disarming creation" whom the audience root for despite his flaws. In the Guardian, Alexis Petridis wrote that audiences find Partridge funny partly because they recognise themselves in him, and Edmund Gordon called Partridge "a magnificent comic creation: a monster of egotism and tastelessness". According to Gordon, Partridge allows progressive audiences to laugh at politically incorrect humour as "every loathsome comment is sold to us not as a gag, but as a gaffe". Writing that Partridge "channels the worst excesses of the privileged white man who considers himself nonetheless a victim", the New Statesman journalist Daniel Curtis saw Partridge as a precursor to "post-truth" politicians such as Nigel Farage and Donald Trump.

Mandatory wrote that Partridge was "a fascinatingly layered and fully realised creation of years of storytelling and a fundamentally contemptible prick – he feels like a living, breathing person, but a living, breathing person that you want to strangle". The Telegraph wrote: "Never has one actor so completely inhabited a sitcom character. We believe Partridge is real, from his side-parted hair down to his tasseled sports-casual loafers." In 2014, Guardian writer Stuart Heritage described Partridge as "one of the greatest and most beloved comic creations of the last few decades". In a 2001 poll by Channel 4, Partridge was voted seventh in their list of the 100 Greatest TV Characters. In a 2017 poll of over 100 comedians, Partridge was voted best TV comedy character and Coogan best male comedy actor, and a scene from I'm Alan Partridge in which Partridge goes to the home of an obsessive fan was voted best comedy scene. In 2021, Rolling Stone named I'm Alan Partridge the 52nd greatest sitcom, writing that it had taken Partridge "from a parody of celebrity-presenter smarm to one of the greatest Britcom characters ever".

The Telegraph credited Partridge with influencing cringe comedies such as The Inbetweeners, Nighty Night and Peep Show. According to Den of Geek, he has so influenced British culture that "Partridgisms" have become everyday vernacular. "Monkey Tennis", one of Partridge's desperate television proposals, has become shorthand for absurd television concepts. Another, "Youth Hostelling with Chris Eubank", was used by the hostel booking site Hostelworld as the basis of a 2015 television advert with the boxer Chris Eubank. In 2020, Coogan said that many of Partridge's inane ideas had since become real programmes, making satire more difficult. Accidental Partridge, an unofficial Twitter account which collects quotes reminiscent of Partridge's speech from real media figures, had attracted 144,000 followers by May 2014.

Partridge has become associated with the city of Norwich. An art exhibition inspired by Partridge opened in Norwich in July 2015. In September 2020, an unofficial statue of Partridge created by sculptors in the film industry was temporarily erected outside the Forum in Norwich; Partridge's official Twitter account released a statement endorsing the statue. In October 2021, a fan convention took place at the Mercure Norwich Hotel and was attended by more than 250 people.

Appearances

Guest appearances

Books

Fundraising

DVD

References

External links

I'm Alan Partridge

Comedy radio characters
Comedy television characters
British sitcom characters
Fictional DJs
Fictional English people
Fictional interviewers
Fictional radio personalities
Fictional reporters
Fictional television personalities
Fictional characters introduced in 1991
Talk show characters
Male characters in radio
Male characters in television